Marcello Baschenis (Genova, 1829 – Genova, 5 December 1888) was an Italian painter.

Baschenis was a long term student at the Accademia Ligustica di Belle Arti, where he also received his first prizes between 1864 and 1866 while studying the nude as Giuseppe Isola's student. His professional career began in 1850 at the Exposition of the Società Promotrice di Belle Arti. His first publicly shown work was a drawing of Saint John the Baptist. Baschenis continued to participate in the Exposition from 1851 to 1856 and from 1863 to 1878; among the works presented there were: La pastorella and La vedova sfortunata in 1851; Belisario and Ritratto d'uomo in 1852; La malinconia, Partenza and Famiglia savoiarda in 1854.<ref name="pl">Pittori Liguri, Marcello Baschenis</ref>

Until the end of the 1870s, Baschenis constantly exhibited in the Northern Italian area, developing his techniques in landscape and portrait painting with religious, natural, and popular scenes,  in many genres of works. Although not many works of this vast production are extant today, some of those that do include The Prayer of the Betrothed (1871, at the Gallery of Modern Art in Genoa) and L'arrotino ambulante (1875, at the Quadreria dell'Amministration) Provincial).

He also created many ex voto paintings, some of which appear today at the Shrine of Nostra Signora della Guardia, the Santuario della Madonna del Monte and the Santuario di Nostra Signora della Vittoria in Mignanego, Italy. In the Sant'Andrea di Foggia Church in Rapallo there is an altarpiece from 1876 depicting San Giorgio and San Contardo d'Este in adoration of the Madonna del Rosario. In the Santuario di Nostra Signora Incoronata, moreover, there is a pair of canvases from 1875 dedicated to the popular legend of Pacciûgo e Pacciûga.BeWeB - Beni Ecclesiastici in web, Baschenis M. (1875), Pacciugo getta in mare Pacciuga

Baschenis died in Genova on 5 December 1888.

He is among the painters mentioned in the dictionary written by art critic and historian Agostino Mario Comanducci.

 Gallery

References

Sources
 Giuliano Matteucci, Pittori & pittura dell'Ottocento italiano, De Agostini, 1996-1997
 Agostino Mario Comanducci, Pittori italiani dell'Ottocento, C.E. Artisti d'Italia, 1934
 Agostino Mario Comanducci, Dizionario illustrato dei pittori disegnatori e incisori italiani moderni e contemporanei, Patuzzi editore, 1962
 Giuseppe Costa, Pittori liguri dell'800 e del primo '900, Sagep, 1994. ISBN 9788870585322
 Mario Labò, Mostra di pittura ligure dell'Ottocento, Società per le Belle Arti Genova, 1926
 Scienza e letteratura: passioni e ispirazioni nell'arte del secondo Ottocento, Galleria D'Arte Moderna (Art Gallery), 28 maggio 2017

External links
Dizionario degli artisti, Baschenis Marcello'', Istituto Matteucci, 1997

1828 births
1888 deaths
19th-century Italian painters
Italian male painters
Painters from Genoa
Italian still life painters
19th-century Italian male artists